Fikri Junaidi (born 2 April 2000 in Singapore) is a Singaporean footballer who now plays for Young Lions in his home country.

Career

Junaidi started his senior career with Geylang International. In 2020, he signed for Young Lions in the Singapore Premier League, where he has made one league appearance and scored zero goals.

Career statistics

Club

Notes

References

External links
 Teen Fikri gets 2nd German stint before going to ITE

Singaporean footballers
2000 births
Living people
Young Lions FC players
Association football midfielders